Strazha may refer to:

Strazha, Smolyan Province, a village in Smolyan municipality, Smolyan Province
Strazha, Targovishte Province, a village in Targovishte municipality, Targovishte Province

See also
Straža (disambiguation)
Straja (disambiguation)